Marc Kravetz (2 October 1942 – 28 October 2022) was a French reporter and journalist. He received the Albert Londres Prize in 1980 for his reporting on the Iranian Revolution while working for the daily newspaper Libération and presented the column .

Biography
Kravetz was born during World War II into a Jewish family with a modest background. His father worked as a secretary in Blanc-Mesnil and had been a member of the French Communist Party since 1932. His mother worked in the municipal government of Levallois-Perret.

He became head of the FUA order service, traveling to Algeria in 1962 with his friend, to be a volunteer teacher.

He also assisted Mustapha Khayati in writing the pamphlet On the Poverty of Student Life, published in November 1966. At the time, he adhered to the theses of the far-left and participated in a guerrilla training session in Cuba led by Christian Blanc and Pierre Goldman. During the events of May 68, he contributed to the newspaper .

From 1975 to 1990, Kravetz covered many conflicts in the Middle East, such as the Lebanese Civil War and the Israeli–Palestinian conflict. In 1979, he carried out a report on the Iranian Revolution and wrote the book Irano nox after his trip. From 1997 to 2000, he directed Air-France magazine alongside Jean Bayle. In 2009, he became a member of the sponsorship committee of the Institut régional du cinéma et de l'audiovisuel, chaired by Magà Ettori with its head office in Bastia.

After writing the column Les Matins de France Culture for many years, he took part in the new program  from January to July 2011 on France Culture.

Marc Kravetz died on 28 October 2022, at the age of 80.

Publications
L'insurrection étudiante, 2-13 mai 1968, ensemble critique et documentaire (1968)
Irano nox (1982)
Armand Gatti (2003)
Portraits du jour, 150 histoires pour un tour du monde (2008)
Obama : petite encyclopédie (2008)
Portraits d’animaux, 50 histoires pour un bestiaire (2009)

References

1942 births
2022 deaths
20th-century French journalists
21st-century French journalists
Albert Londres Prize recipients
French people of Jewish descent
French war correspondents